When You're a Boy is the debut solo album by Susanna Hoffs. It begins with the Billboard Top 40 single "My Side of the Bed", includes the track "Unconditional Love" (co-written by Cyndi Lauper), and ends with a cover of "Boys Keep Swinging", the 1979 song written by David Bowie and Brian Eno. The album's title comes from the lyrics to the latter.

The album peaked at No. 83 on the US albums chart.

Three singles were released from the album: "My Side of the Bed", "Unconditional Love", and "Only Love". The first two featured the non-LP B-side "Circus Girl".

Reception
Jimmy Nicol of Q gave the album four out of five stars and wrote, "An album which expands the Bangles' brief into undreamed of territories. She reveals herself to be a highly inventive composer, lyricist – and even humourist... After all, how many other American pop stars embarking on a solo career would name their album after a late '70s English art-rock 45?"

AllMusic's review was negative, giving it one and a half out of five stars, remarking that "Although the album was released in 1991, it sounds like bad mid-'80s music. Hoffs and the Bangles had a few catchy pop ditties; however, there are none to be found here."

Track listing

Personnel

Susanna Hoffs – vocals, guitar
David Kahne – keyboards, arranger, mixing, producer, engineer, programming
Rusty Anderson – guitar
John Entwistle – bass guitar
Randy Jackson – bass guitar
Benmont Tench – keyboards
Jim Keltner – drums
Zachary Alford – drums
Gary Ferguson – drums
Carlos Vega – drums
Juliana Hatfield – backing vocals
Tom Kelly – backing vocals
Robin Lane  backing vocals
Donovan Leitch – backing vocals
Eric Lowen – backing vocals
Dan Navarro – backing vocals
Maria Vidal – backing vocals
Steve Churchyard – engineer
Clark Germain – engineer
David Leonard – engineer, mixing
Joel Stoner – engineer, mixing
Ray Blair – assistant engineer
Greg Goldman – assistant engineer
Ed Goodreau – assistant engineer
Mike Kloster – assistant engineer
Sylvia Massy – assistant engineer
Charles Paakkari – assistant engineer
Mike Piersante – assistant engineer
Keith "KC" Cohen – mixing
Lori Fumar – mixing assistant
Wally Traugott – mastering
Randee Saint Nicholas – photography

Charts

References

1991 debut albums
Susanna Hoffs albums
Albums produced by David Kahne
Columbia Records albums